Michael Olsen may refer to:

 Lee Michaels (Michael Olsen, born 1945), American rock musician
 Michael Peter Olsen (born 1974), musician and producer
 Michael-James Olsen (born 1994), Australian/American film actor
 Mike Olsen (born 1968), American stock car racing driver
 Mike Schæfer Olsen (born 1985), Danish musician and producer

See also
 Michael Olson (born 1979), basketball coach
 Michael Fors Olson (born 1966), Catholic bishop